On Tour Forever is a live EP album released by Blues Traveler in 1992. Only ten thousand copies were produced, packaged as a double album with copies of the band's second album, Travelers and Thieves.

The first three tracks were recorded at The Palace Theater in New Haven, Connecticut on October 30, 1991. The last track, featuring Carlos Santana on guitar, was recorded at Golden Gate Park in San Francisco, California on September 29, 1991.

Included with the recording was a tribute to Bill Graham, the band's tour promoter, who had died shortly after the release of Travelers and Thieves.

Track listing

 "The Tiding" > "Onslaught" - 8:12
 "Crystal Flame" - 14:08
 "Optimistic Thought" - 4:06
 "Mountain Cry" (with Carlos Santana) - 21:14

Concert Recordings
 Blues Traveler Live at Palace Theatre on October 30, 1991
 Blues Traveler Live at Polo Field, Golden Gate Park on September 29, 1991

Blues Traveler albums
1992 EPs
Live EPs
1992 live albums
A&M Records live albums
A&M Records EPs